Singil Station (pronounced sin-gill) is a station on the Seoul Subway's Line 1 and 5.

The transfer distance between the platforms on Lines 1 and 5 are fairly long, around 260 metres. The Line 1 station is the first aboveground station in South Korea to have operating platform screen doors.

References

Seoul Metropolitan Subway stations
Metro stations in Yeongdeungpo District
Railway stations opened in 1996